Daojiao may refer to:

Taoism, especially when considered as a religion
The Taoist side of Chinese alchemy
Daojiao Zhizu ("Taoist Ancestor"), a name of the high taoist divinity Daode Tianzun
Daojiao, Guangdong, a Chinese town
Zhongsha Daojiao Town, a disputed administrative area of the Zhongsha Islands

See also
Dajiao, an annual Taoist ritual/festival